Betsy Hollow is a valley in Oregon County in the U.S. state of Missouri.

Betsy Hollow has the name of Betsy Sipe, a pioneer settler.

References

Valleys of Oregon County, Missouri
Valleys of Missouri